Mariana Vasileva-Toteva (born 6 July 1974 in Bulgaria) is an Azerbaijani rhythmic gymnastics trainer of Bulgarian origin who is the Deputy Minister of Youth and Sports of Azerbaijan and Head coach of the Azerbaijan Rhythmic Gymnastics Federation.

Career 
Vasileva was a former Bulgarian rhythmic gymnast and worked as a coach in Levski club in Sofia, Bulgaria. In 2007, she received an invitation from the Azerbaijan Gymnastics Federation to work as coach, not long after; she relocated in Baku, Azerbaijan with her immediate family (husband and 2 children). Since 2009, Vasileva has been appointed as head coach of the Azerbaijan Rhythmic Gymnastics Federation. In 2013 she received the title of Honored Trainer of Azerbaijan. In 2015, after the successful performance of the national team at the 1st European Games, she was awarded the Honorary Diploma of the President of Azerbaijan. During the coaching period of Mariana Vasileva, the Azerbaijani national team managed to win prizes at the European Championships in 2009, 2011, 2013, 2014, 2018 and 2020. As of 29 November 2021, she is the Deputy Minister of Youth and Sports of Azerbaijan.

Coaching history and notable students 

Since Vasileva's appointment as head coach of Azerbaijan's Rhythmic Gymnastics, Azerbaijan has had international success both in individual and group especially amongst a new generation of gymnasts, notable students include:

 Marina Durunda (born 1997) - multiple World Cup medalist
 Lala Yusifova (born 1996) - 2012, 2013 (Grand Prix Final) medalist
 Zhala Piriyeva (born 2000) - European Junior medalist
 Arzu Jalilova (born 2004) - World and European Junior medalist
 Zohra Aghamirova (born 2001) - Summer Universiade (2019) medalist

Personal life 
Mariana Vasileva is a citizen of Azerbaijan but retains her Bulgarian citizenship. She speaks Bulgarian, Azerbaijani and Russian. She is married and has two daughters: Siyana and Valeria. Siyana Vasileva has competed for the Azerbaijani rhythmic gymnastics team and is the youngest naturalized athlete in the history of the country.

References

External links
 Azerbaijan Rhythmic Gymnastics Coach Profile

Living people
1974 births
Gymnastics coaches
Bulgarian rhythmic gymnasts
Bulgarian sportspeople
People from Targovishte
Bulgarian expatriate sportspeople in Azerbaijan